The 300th Field Artillery Regiment is a Field Artillery regiment of the United States Army.

Lineage
Parent unit organized in the Wyoming National Guard during 1888 as the 1st Regiment, to consist of troop A. at Laramie and troop B. at Cheyenne.
Redesignated in 1890 as the 1st Regiment, Infantry.
Mustered into federal service 7–10 May 1898 at Cheyenne as the 1st Battalion, Wyoming Volunteer Infantry for service in the Philippine Islands.
Mustered out 23 September 1899 at San Francisco, California.
Reorganized in late 1899 as the 2nd Regiment Infantry.
Redesignated in 1903 as the 3rd Regiment, Infantry
Reorganized and redesignated 29 April 1915 into 1st Separate Battalion, 2nd Separate Battalion and Separate Company.
1st and 2nd Separate Battalions mustered into federal service 4 July 1916 at Cheyenne for Mexican Border duty.
Provisional Regiment of Infantry organized in November 1916 from the 1st and 2nd Battalions.
 Mustered out of federal service 9 March 1917 at Fort D.A. Russell. Wyoming.
1st and 2nd Separate battalions and Separate Company consolidated, reorganized and redesignated 23 June 1917 in the Wyoming National Guard, as the 3rd Regiment, Infantry.
Regiment (Less 2nd battalion) called into federal service 25 July 1917; (2nd Battalion called into Federal service 25 march 1917 as the 2nd Separate Battalion); entire regiment drafted into Federal service 5 August 1917.
Regiment broken up 19 September- 5 October 1917 an elements consolidated with
 148th Field Artillery
 116th Ammunition Train
 146th Machine Gun Battalion
(all elements of the 41st Infantry Division (United States)
(148th Field Artillery demobilized in March 1919 at Camp Dix, New Jersey)
Former 3rd Regiment, Infantry reconstructed in 1920 in the Wyoming National Guard as the 1st Cavalry; 1st Squadron organized and federally recognized 27 April 1920 with headquarters at Cheyenne.
Redesignated 1 May 1922 as the 115th Cavalry Regiment. Cavalrymen and horses of 115th in period uniform appeared in the cavalry charge scenes of the 1936 film The Plainsman.
Inducted into federal service 24 February 1941 at Cheyenne, at which time it was the 115th Cavalry Regiment, Horse-Mechanized.
Reorganized and redesignated 19 May 1942 as the 115th Cavalry Regiment, Mechanized. 1st Squadron reorganized and redesignated 1 January 1944 as the 115th Cavalry Reconnaissance Squadron, Mechanized.
Inactivated 6 march 1945 at Camp Polk, Louisiana.
Redesignated as the 300th Armored Field Artillery Battalion and allotted to the Wyoming National Guard 29 July 1946.
Reorganized and federally recognized 30 January 1947 with headquarters at Sheridan.
Ordered into active federal service 19 August 1950 at Sheridan. (300th Armored Field Artillery Battalion NGUS organized and Federally recognized 1 October 1952 with headquarters at Sheridan)
released from active federal service and reverted to state control, 27 September 1954; Concurrently, federal recognition withdrawn from 300th Armored Field Artillery Battalion NGUS)
Consolidated with 49th Field Artillery Regiment (United States) 1 August 1959.

Distinctive unit insignia
Description
A Gold color metal and enamel device 1 5/32 inches (2.94 cm) in height overall consisting of a shield blazoned: Gules, five fleurs-de-lis Or one, three, and one, on a chief embattled Azure fimbriated of the second a demi-sun issuant of the like. Attached below the shield a Gold scroll inscribed “POWDER RIVER” in Blue letters.
Symbolism
The red shield and the five gold fleurs-de-lis are for Artillery service in France. The chief is blue for Infantry service in the Philippines. The gold sun recalls both the Far Eastern service and the shoulder sleeve insignia of the 41st Division. The parting line is yellow for the Cavalry assignment of the regiment, and the line is made embattled recalling the fighting record of the old organization. The motto has been the battle cry and catch word of the regiment from its earliest days and through three wars.
Background
The distinctive unit insignia was originally approved for the 115th Cavalry Regiment on 12 June 1924. It was redesignated for the 115th Cavalry Reconnaissance Squadron, Mechanized on 12 July 1944. The insignia was redesignated for the 300th Armored Field Artillery Battalion on 7 February 1952. It was redesignated for the 49th Artillery Regiment on 5 April 1961. It was redesignated for the 49th Field Artillery Regiment on 19 June 1972. It was redesignated effective 1 October 1996, for the 300th Field Artillery Regiment. The insignia was amended to correct the authorization of the insignia on 4 November 2004.

Coat of arms
Blazon
Shield: Gules, five fleurs-de-lis Or one, three, and one, on a chief embattled Azure fimbriated of the second a demi-sun issuant of the like.
Crest: That for the regiments and separate battalions of the Wyoming Army National Guard: From a wreath Or and Gules, an American bison statant Proper.
Motto: POWDER RIVER.
Symbolism
Shield: The red shield and the five gold fleurs-de-lis are for Artillery service in France. The chief is blue for Infantry service in the Philippines. The gold sun recalls both the Far Eastern service and the shoulder sleeve insignia of the 41st Division. The parting line is yellow for the Cavalry assignment of the regiment, and the line is made embattled recalling the fighting record of the old organization. The motto has been the battle cry and catch word of the regiment from its earliest days and through three wars.
Crest: The crest is that of the Wyoming Army National Guard.
Background: The coat of arms was originally approved for the 115th Cavalry Regiment on 9 June 1924. It was redesignated for the 115th Cavalry Reconnaissance Squadron, Mechanized on 10 July 1944. The insignia was redesignated for the 300th Armored Field Artillery Battalion on 7 February 1952. It was redesignated for the 49th Artillery Regiment on 5 April 1961. It was redesignated for the 49th Field Artillery Regiment on 19 June 1972. It was redesignated effective 1 October 1996, for the 300th Field Artillery Regiment. The insignia was amended to correct the authorization of the insignia on 4 November 2004.

Campaign streamers
War with Spain
Manila
Philippine Insurrection
Manila
Malolos
Luzon 1899
World War I
Champagne-Marne
Aisne- Marne
St. Mihiel
Meuse-Argonne
Champagne 1918
Korean War
First UN counteroffensive
CCF spring offensive
UN summer fall offensive
Second Korean winter
Korea, summer fall 1952
Third Korean winter
Korea, summer 1953

Decorations
Presidential Unit Citation, (Army), Streamer embroidered HONGCHON
Presidential Unit Citation, (Army), Streamer embroidered KUMSONG
Meritorious Unit Commendation, (Army), Streamer embroidered KOREA 1952
Meritorious Unit Commendation, (Army), Streamer embroidered KOREA 1952-1953
Republic of Korea Presidential Unit Citation, Streamer embroidered KOREA 1950-1952
Republic of Korea Presidential Unit Citation, Streamer embroidered KOREA 1952

See also
24th Cavalry Division (United States)
Field Artillery Branch (United States)

References

External links

300
300
Military units and formations established in 1880